Warren Peak is a 9,710-foot-elevation (2,960 meter) mountain summit located in Modoc County, California, United States.

Description
Warren Peak ranks as the third-highest summit in the Warner Mountains which are located in the northeast corner of California. The summit is set within the South Warner Wilderness on land managed by Modoc National Forest. The remote peak is situated 20 miles east-southeast of Alturas, California, and four miles west of Surprise Valley. Precipitation runoff from this mountain drains west into Pine Creek which is a tributary of the South Fork Pit River, and east to Middle Alkali Lake via Owl Creek and Cottonwood Creek. The Summit Trail traverses the east slope of the peak and provides an approach option. The trail also leads to the most popular destination in the wilderness, Patterson Lake, which lies directly below the summit in the north cirque. Whitebark pine covers some of the peak's slopes which are composed of volcanic rock.
The landform's toponym has been officially adopted by the U.S. Board on Geographic Names and the name has appeared in publications since at least 1884. The mountain has also been known as "Warren's Peak" and Buck Mountain.

See also

References

External links
 Weather forecast: Warren Peak
 National Geodetic Survey Data Sheet

Mountains of Modoc County, California
North American 2000 m summits
Mountains of Northern California
Modoc National Forest